Ahmed Faris Al-Binali (born 27 August 1975) is a Qatari former footballer. He last played as a defender for Al Gharrafa. He was also a member of the Qatar national football team.

He retired on 12 May 2012 at the age of 36, making the announcement directly after winning the 2012 Emir Cup with Al Gharafa.

References

External links

Ahmed Faris at Goalzz.com

1977 births
Living people
Qatari footballers
Qatar international footballers
Al-Arabi SC (Qatar) players
Al-Gharafa SC players
Qatar Stars League players
Association football defenders